Gossas is a town in Fatick Region in western Senegal, about 90 km from the capital.

Transport 

The town is served by a station on the Dakar-Niger Railway.

See also 

 Transport in Senegal
 Railway stations in Senegal

References 

Populated places in Fatick Region
Communes of Senegal